Kenny Imes (born February 13, 1947) is a U.S. politician and a previous Republican member of the Kentucky House of Representatives representing District 5. Imes currently serves as Calloway County Judge/Executive after winning a full four-year term in the 2018 general election.

Education
Imes attended Murray State University.

Elections
2012 When District 5 Democratic Representative Melvin Henley retired and left the seat open, Imes was unopposed for the May 22, 2012 Republican Primary and won the November 6, 2012 General election with 9,639 votes (56.0%) against Democratic nominee Hal Kemp, who had run for the seat in 2006.

References

External links
Official page at the Kentucky General Assembly
Campaign site

Kenny Imes at Ballotpedia
Kenny Imes at the National Institute on Money in State Politics

Place of birth missing (living people)
1947 births
Living people
Republican Party members of the Kentucky House of Representatives
Murray State University alumni
People from Murray, Kentucky
21st-century American politicians